Surfing (Spanish:Surf), for the 2013 Bolivarian Games, took place from 17 November to 22 November 2013.

Medal table
Key:

Medalists

References

Events at the 2013 Bolivarian Games
2013 in surfing
Bolivarian Games
Surfing in Peru
Bolivarian Games